Daniel Măstăcan (born 7 September 1980, in Bârlad) is a Romanian rower.

References 
 
 

1980 births
Living people
Romanian male rowers
Sportspeople from Bârlad
Olympic rowers of Romania
Rowers at the 2004 Summer Olympics
World Rowing Championships medalists for Romania